Zainab may refer to:
 Zainab (given name), an Arabic female given name
 Zainab (surname), an Arabic surname